A total solar eclipse will occur on September 23, 2090. A solar eclipse occurs when the Moon passes between Earth and the Sun, thereby totally or partly obscuring the image of the Sun for a viewer on Earth. A total solar eclipse occurs when the Moon's apparent diameter is larger than the Sun's, blocking all direct sunlight, turning day into darkness. Totality occurs in a narrow path across Earth's surface, with the partial solar eclipse visible over a surrounding region thousands of kilometres wide.
This solar eclipse will be the first total solar eclipse visible from Great Britain since August 11, 1999, and the first visible from Ireland since May 22, 1724. The totality will be visible in southern Greenland, Valentia, West Cork, Poole, Newquay, Plymouth, Southampton and the Isle of Wight, and a partially eclipsed sun will be visible in Birmingham, London, Exeter, Cardiff, Belfast, Dublin, Weston Super Mare, Bristol and Oxford.

Related eclipses

Solar eclipses 2087–2090

Tritos series

Metonic series 
 All eclipses in this table occur at the Moon's ascending node.

Notes

References

2090 09 23
2090 in science
2090 09 23
2090 09 23